Satish Chandra Samanta (15 December 1900 – 4 June 1983) was an Indian independence movement activist and a member of the Lok Sabha from 1952–77. At the age of 15 he was influenced by his guru, Swami Prajnanananda Saraswati and adopted the life of Brahmacharya and took up a life of serving the people.

He quit Bengal Engineering College (then an affiliate of the University of Calcutta)  in his second year of study in order to fight for freedom of India from the clutches of the British. He started serving through, the activities organised by the local branch of the Indian National Congress. Later, he became the president of Tamluk Congress Committee and remained an active congress member for decades. He was known for his leadership qualities and other constructive work. His leadership qualities could be observed during  the formation of a parallel government named Tamralipta Jatiya Sarkar (Tamralipta National Government)  in Tamluk during the Quit India Movement. This body was formed on 17 December 1942 and Samanta was the "Sarbadhinayak"(chief executive) of this government until his arrest in June 1943. It lasted till September 1944. It undertook cyclone relief work, gave grants to schools and organized an armed Vidyut Vahini.

In addition to his political work, he helped the people by participating in activities related to improving civic health. He organised and led activities like cleaning roads and choked-up ponds to prevent malaria, nursing cholera patients, organising free medical camps, training volunteers and spreading education and literacy in backward areas. After Independence, Satish Chandra Samanta remained as a Member of Parliament for more than three decades. He was elected to the 1st Lok Sabha from Tamluk constituency in 1952 and re-elected to the Lok Sabha from the same constituency in 1957, 1962, 1967 and 1971.

References

Further reading
 Maity, Pradyot Kumar (2003). Quit India Movement In Bengal And The Tamralipta Jatiya Sarkar, Kolkata:Punthi Pustak, .
 https://archive.today/20130218104518/http://www.smritisoudha.in/

1900 births
1983 deaths
People from Purba Medinipur district
India MPs 1952–1957
University of Calcutta alumni
Lok Sabha members from West Bengal
Indian National Congress politicians
India MPs 1957–1962
India MPs 1962–1967
India MPs 1967–1970
India MPs 1971–1977
Bangla Congress politicians
Indian independence activists from West Bengal